The Toyota bZ3 is a battery electric compact sedan jointly developed by Toyota, BYD Auto and FAW Toyota through the BYD Toyota EV Technology (BTET) joint venture, to be produced in China in 2023. It is the second model to be part of the Toyota bZ ("beyond Zero") series of zero-emissions vehicles following the bZ4X crossover SUV, which shares platforms with the bZ3. Previously, the design of the bZ3 was previewed by the bZ SDN concept car in December 2021.

The bZ3 debuted in October 2022 for the Chinese market. It is powered by a Blade lithium iron phosphate battery developed by BYD, which offers a claimed  electric range. The drag coefficient is also claimed at 0.218 Cd.

References 

bZ3
Cars introduced in 2022
Compact cars
Sedans
Production electric cars
Front-wheel-drive vehicles